The 2007 NCAA Division I women's soccer tournament (also known as the 2007 Women's College Cup) was the 26th annual single-elimination tournament to determine the national champion of NCAA Division I women's collegiate soccer. The semifinals and championship game were played at Aggie Soccer Complex in College Station, Texas from December 7–9, 2007 while the preceding rounds were played at various sites across the country from November 15–30.

USC defeated Florida State in the final, 2–0, to win their first national title. Both teams were making their first appearances in the tournament final while USC managed to become the first program since Florida in 1998 to win the College Cup in the first ever appearance. The Trojans (20–3–2) were coached by Ali Khosroshahin.

The most outstanding offensive player was Amy Rodriguez from USC, and the most outstanding defensive player was Kristin Olsen, also from USC. Rodriguez and Olsen, alongside nine other players, were named to the All-Tournament team.

The tournament's leading scorer, with 8 goals and 1 assist, was Sanna Talonen from Florida State.

Qualification

All Division I women's soccer programs were eligible to qualify for the tournament. The tournament field remained fixed at 64 teams.

Format
Just as before, the final two rounds, deemed the Women's College Cup, were played at a pre-determined neutral site. All other rounds were played on campus sites at the home field of the higher-seeded team. The only exceptions were the first two rounds, which were played at regional campus sites. The top sixteen teams hosted four team-regionals on their home fields (with some exceptions, noted below) during the tournament's first weekend.

National seeds

Records

Bracket

North Carolina Bracket

Stanford Bracket

Penn State Bracket

UCLA Bracket

College Cup

All-tournament team
Amy Rodriguez, USC (most outstanding offensive player)
Kristin Olsen, USC (most outstanding defensive player)
Lauren Cheney, UCLA
Janessa Currier, USC
Amanda DaCosta, Florida State
Christina DiMartino, UCLA
Kerri Hanks, Notre Dame
Kasey Johnson, USC
 Sanna Talonen, Florida State
Marihelen Tomer, USC
 Mami Yamaguchi, Florida State

See also 
 NCAA Women's Soccer Championships (Division II, Division III)
 NCAA Men's Soccer Championships (Division I, Division II, Division III)

References

NCAA
NCAA Women's Soccer Championship
NCAA Division I Women's Soccer Tournament
NCAA Division I Women's Soccer Tournament
NCAA Division I Women's Soccer Tournament